Shama Haider (born December 20, 1948) is a Democratic Party politician who represents the 37th legislative district in the New Jersey General Assembly since taking office on January 11, 2022, making her the first Muslim woman to be elected to the New Jersey Legislature.

Political career
Born and raised in Pakistan, where she attended the University of Punjab, Haider served as Secretary to the First Lady of Pakistan Nusrat Bhutto, Haider emigrated to the United States in 1977. She was elected in both 2001 and 2015 to serve on the Tenafly, New Jersey Borough Council. In the November 2021 general election, she was elected together with her running mates Gordon M. Johnson to the Senate and Ellen Park in the Assembly, making her the first Muslim woman to serve in the state legislature.

Committees 
Committee assignments for the current session are:
Environment and Solid Waste
Transportation and Independent Authorities

District 37
Each of the 40 districts in the New Jersey Legislature has one representative in the New Jersey Senate and two members in the New Jersey General Assembly. The representatives from the 37th District for the 2022—23 Legislative Session are:
Senator Gordon M. Johnson (D)
Assemblywoman Shama Haider (D)
Assemblywoman Ellen Park (D)

References

External links
Legislative webpage

Democratic Party members of the New Jersey General Assembly
21st-century American politicians
American people of Pakistani descent
American politicians of Pakistani descent
Living people
Pakistani emigrants to the United States
People from Tenafly, New Jersey
Politicians from Bergen County, New Jersey
New Jersey city council members
University of the Punjab alumni
Women state legislators in New Jersey
21st-century American women politicians
1948 births